Gerhard Steinkogler (born September 29, 1959 in Graz, Austria) is an Austrian former professional footballer who played as a striker.

During his club career, Steinkogler played for Grazer AK, Austria Wien, Werder Bremen, SSW Innsbruck, First Vienna and Wiener Sport-Club. He also made five appearances for the Austria national team, scoring one goal.

External links
 
 

1959 births
Living people
Footballers from Graz
Austrian footballers
Austria international footballers
Association football forwards
Grazer AK players
SV Werder Bremen players
FK Austria Wien players
FC Wacker Innsbruck players
First Vienna FC players
Wiener Sport-Club players
Austrian Football Bundesliga players
Bundesliga players
Austrian expatriate footballers
Austrian expatriate sportspeople in West Germany
Expatriate footballers in West Germany